The Newport 20 is an American sailboat, that was designed by Gary Mull and first built in 1968. The design is out of production.

Production
The boat was built by Newport Boats and also by Lindsey Plastics under its Capital Yachts Inc. brand in the United States. Only three or four were built and the design is now out of production.

Design
The Newport 20 is a small recreational keelboat, built predominantly of fiberglass. It has a masthead sloop rig, an internally-mounted spade rudder and a fixed fin keel. It displaces  and carries  of ballast.

See also
List of sailing boat types

References

Keelboats
1960s sailboat type designs
Sailing yachts
Sailboat type designs by Gary Mull
Sailboat types built by Capital Yachts
Sailboat types built by Newport Boats